Ubli may refer to several places:

In Croatia:
 Uble, Lastovo, sometimes referred to as Ubli, a settlement on the island of Lastovo

In Montenegro:
 Ubli, Cetinje, a settlement in the Cetinje municipality
 Ubli, Herceg Novi, a settlement in the Herceg Novi municipality
 Ubli, Nikšić, a settlement in the Nikšić municipality
 Ubli, Podgorica, a settlement in the Podgorica municipality